Charles Curtiss (1908–1993) was an American communist.

Born on July 4, 1908, in Chicago as Samuel Kurz, the son of poor immigrants from Poland, he changed his name to Charles Curtiss and earned his living by working as a miner and sailor, before finally becoming a skilled printer.

In 1928, Charles Curtiss joined the Communist League of America, the Trotskyist movement led by James P. Cannon. As a printer, Curtiss took responsibility for producing the movement's weekly paper The Militant.

In 1932, Curtiss moved to Los Angeles to build the Trotskyist movement on the West Coast. In 1938, the Communist League became the Socialist Workers Party.

Charles Curtiss, who was fluent in Spanish, was repeatedly sent as a representative of the American Trotskyist movement to Mexico in the 1930s. There he was known as Carlos Curtiss. He also visited Leon Trotsky in Coyoacán several times. From June 1939 to August 1940, Curtiss lived in the Trotsky household and his wife, Lillian Ilstien, who he had married in 1935, served as secretary for Trotsky's wife Natalia Sedova.

Charles Curtiss functioned as Trotsky's primary link with the Mexican Trotskyists. It would have been illegal and unwise under the terms on which Trotsky was granted asylum in Mexico for Trotsky to maintain direct political contact with radical communist revolutionaries in his host country. Curtiss also tried to resolve the personal differences between Trotsky and the famous Mexican artist Diego Rivera. Charles Curtiss was not present on August 20, 1940, when Trotsky was attacked and killed by the Stalinist agent Ramón Mercader, who had infiltrated the household, but it is said that Curtiss had always been suspicious of Mercader and had warned Trotsky to be careful around him.

After the assassination of Trotsky, Curtiss and his wife returned to the United States and the Socialist Workers Party, living and working in Los Angeles for a couple of years. When 18 of the SWP's most prominent leaders, including James P. Cannon, Farrell Dobbs and Carl Skoglund, were sentenced to jail according to the Smith Act, for opposing US involvement in World War II, Charles Curtiss moved to New York City to help take over the leadership of the party. However, Curtiss was soon drafted into the US army and sent to Italy to fight in the war.

After the war, Curtiss returned to the Socialist Workers Party, but he left the party in 1951. However, his wife Lillian remained in the SWP for many years.

Charles Curtiss died of heart failure in Los Angeles on December 20, 1993.

External links
The Lubitz TrotskyanaNet provides a biographical sketch and a selective bibliography on Charles Curtiss

1908 births
1993 deaths
People from Chicago
Members of the Communist League of America
Members of the Workers Party of the United States
Members of the Socialist Party of America
Members of the Socialist Workers Party (United States)